Puig Major is the highest peak on the Spanish island of Majorca. It is situated in the Serra de Tramuntana mountains. As the mountain is located in a military zone, the neighbouring peak Puig de Massanella (1,364 m) is considered the highest accessible summit on the island.

The nearest town and municipality to Puig Major is Sóller, a village near the north west coast of Majorca.

Military Zone 
There is currently a military installation, a radar, of the US Air Force at its summit. As a consequence of the Cold War, the first Friendship, Defense, and Cooperation Agreement between Spain and the United States, signed in 1954, agreed on the installation of radar at the top of Puig Major for NATO air control of the Western Mediterranean, starting the works of the new road, barracks, reservoir and radar station in 1955. In December 1959, they were completed, and access was permanently restricted. In 2000 the facilities were modernized, and a new type of radar was installed, which has recently allowed the demolition of some obsolete buildings and facilities near the summit. The Puig Major base is an organic-operational dependency of the Combat Air Command. Puig Major Air Barracks/Air Surveillance Station EVA-7.

Its installation meant a tremendous environmental impact on the area due to the need to truncate the summit to obtain a flat surface, which meant a loss of height of around 9 meters. The access road to the summit, with a very aggressive layout (straight lines, without adapting to the contours of the terrain) and without any prevention of environmental or landscape impacts, destroyed the old stone path that ascended from the Coll de N'Arbona, widely used by the people of Sóller. The accumulation of debris cones or scree, as a result of these works, has caused significant damage to the slopes of the summit, which are the habitat of numerous endemic plants.

Being military land and belonging to the Zayas family, access requires the appropriate military authorization from the US Air Force. Their barracks are also at the foot of Puig Major, very close to Son Torrella.

During the second half of the 20th century, two orange protective spheres containing all the radar equipment remained on the summit. They became popular among Mallorcans with the name "Las Bolas" or "Ses Bolles." In 2005 a single, larger sphere was built due to a technological renovation.

Hiking 
Hiking has an extensive tradition in Majorca, and hikers love the Puig Major for its beautiful routes, such as the climb to Penyal des Migdia to the southwest of the summit or Morro D'en Pelut to the north. Both routes partially involve the intrusion into the military zone, commonly without permission.

Gallery

References

Mountains of Mallorca
Mountains of the Balearic Islands